St Thomas More Catholic High School is a coeducational Roman Catholic secondary school for 11- to 16-year-olds, situated close to the centre of Crewe, in Cheshire, England. There are nearly 700 pupils on the roll at the current time.

The Ofsted inspection of 2004 said that the school was "a very effective, successful school that is providing a high quality of education for its pupils". Subsequently, the school has gained Beacon School status acknowledging its very good practice.

The school is one of 62 schools to gain specialist school status in Mathematics and Information Communication Technologies in September 2006. This was added to in March 2009 with the achievement of specialist school status in Modern Foreign Languages.

The school converted to academy status in June 2013.

Notable former pupils
Mark Cueto, international rugby union player
Harry Davis, footballer
Joe Davis, footballer
Rob Hulse, footballer
Steve Leonard, veterinarian and television personality
Junior Brown (footballer), footballer

External links
 Official Website

Secondary schools in the Borough of Cheshire East
Catholic secondary schools in the Diocese of Shrewsbury
Academies in the Borough of Cheshire East